The Siberian Branch of the Russian Academy of Sciences (SBRAS) was established by  the Decree of the Government of the USSR  which was based on the proposal of Mikhail Lavrentyev, Sergei Sobolev and Sergey Khristianovich in 1957 as a regional division of the Academy of Sciences of the USSR, replacing a previous small branch of the Academy of Sciences of the USSR.  Novosibirsk State University was founded to serve as a staff base for the Siberian Branch.

Lavrentyev was also the founding chairman of the branch.

Publications
The Siberian branch publishes two journals — Archaeology, Ethnology & Anthropology of Eurasia and Geography and Natural Resource — in association with Elsevier.

References

1957 establishments in the Soviet Union
Russian Academy of Sciences
Scientific organizations established in 1957